The Chinese Elm cultivar Ulmus parvifolia 'Lois Hole' is a dwarf variety cloned from 'Frosty'.

Description
The clone is distinguished by the more pronounced white margins on its small leaves.

Pests and diseases
The species and its cultivars are highly resistant, but not immune, to Dutch elm disease, and unaffected by the Elm Leaf Beetle Xanthogaleruca luteola.

Cultivation
'Lois Hole' is not known to be in cultivation beyond North America.

Etymology
The cultivar is named for the late Mrs Lois Hole, former Lieutenant Governor of Alberta and horticulturist.

Accessions

North America

Chicago Botanic Garden, Glencoe, Illinois, US. Acc. no. 355–2007.

Nurseries

North America

Arrowhead Alpines , Fowlerville, Michigan, US.
Hoot Owl Hollow Nursery , New Marshfield, Ohio, US.

References

External links

Chinese elm cultivar
Ulmus articles missing images
Ulmus